Someone Great may refer to:

"Someone Great" (song), by LCD Soundsystem
Someone Great (film), a 2018 film